Einojuhani Rautavaara wrote his Piano Concerto No. 3 (subtitled Gift of Dreams) in 1998, nine years after his previous concerto.

The work was commissioned by the eminent conductor/pianist Vladimir Ashkenazy as a concerto which could be conducted from behind the piano, with Ashkenazy serving as soloist and conductor simultaneously. Ashkenazy did premiere the concerto in this dual role with the Helsinki Philharmonic Orchestra in 1999. He has since toured around the world performing the concerto, subsequently recording it on Ondine, a Finnish record company.

The work is in three movements, with a poignant central adagio. The work adopts tonal harmonies, as in Rautavaara's Piano Concerto No. 1, but the overall mood is much more calm and serene.

Structure 
The piano concerto is in three movements, and plays for 25 to 30 minutes:
 Tranquillo (10 minutes)
 Adagio assai (12 minutes)
 Energico (6 minutes)

Instrumentation 
 2 Flutes
 2 Oboes
 2 Clarinets in B
 2 Bassoons
 4 Horns in F
 2 Trumpets in C
 2 Trombones
 Timpani
 Vibraphone
 Tubular bells
 Gong (30')
 Tam-tam (60')
 Gran cassa
 Side drum
 4 Tom-toms
 Xylophone
 Solo piano
 String section

Recordings 
 Vladimir Ashkenazy (pianist/conductor), Helsinki Philharmonic Orchestra, Ondine, Inc. (record company)
 Laura Mikkola (pianist), Netherlands Radio Symphony Orchestra, Eri Klas (conductor), Naxos (record company)

Compositions by Einojuhani Rautavaara
1998 compositions
Rautavaara 03
Music commissioned by ensembles or performers